, born April 15, 1980 and also known as , is a Japanese bassist and current member of rock band Maximum The Hormone. He was the last to join the band in replacement of their former bassist "Key" who departed the band in 1999. He is the youngest member of the band. Uehara's playing style is highly influenced by Flea, the bassist for the band Red Hot Chili Peppers. Uehara is characterized by his twangy and heavy slapping and popping bass style, which is unique in nu metal, as it is more of a funky bass playing style. In many of the band's songs his playing is easily audible over the harsh vocals and guitar riffs. He plays a Sadowsky RV4 and a Modulus FB4 and also sports tattoos that resemble those of his idol, Flea. He very rarely sings, but in some songs such as "Houchou Hasami Cutter Knife Dosu Kiri", "Kyoukatsu" and "Nigire Tsutsu", he has provided backup vocals.

Discography 

Hō (2001)
Mimi Kajiru (2002)
Kusoban (2004)
Rokkinpo Goroshi (2005)
Bu-ikikaesu (2007)
Yoshu Fukushu (2013)

References

External links
 Maximum the Hormone official website 
 Maximum the Hormone official english website

1980 births
21st-century bass guitarists
Japanese heavy metal bass guitarists
Living people
Musicians from Western Tokyo
People from Western Tokyo